Cope Cope railway station was a railway station on the Mildura railway line located in the small town of Cope Cope, Victoria. It opened in 1882 when the line was extended from St Arnaud to Donald. It closed to passengers in 1987 due to extremely low passenger demand.

Read also 
Cope Cope
Mildura railway station
Yelta railway station
Avoca railway line

References

Disused railway stations in Victoria (Australia)
Railway stations in Australia opened in 1882
Railway stations closed in 1987